Merrimon-Wynne House, also known as the Merrimon House and Wynne Hall, is a historic home located at Raleigh, Wake County, North Carolina.  The house was built about 1875, and is a two-story, four bay, Italianate style frame dwelling with a cross-gabled roof and somewhat irregular massing.  It is sheathed in weatherboard and features a Stick Style / Eastlake movement front porch with abundant ornamentation.  The house was remodeled and complementary bay windows added about 1910.  The house was built by Senator Augustus Summerfield Merrimon (1830-1892).

The property was previously listed in the National Register of Historic Places in 1975 as the Merrimon House, when it stood at 526 North Wilmington Street.  It was delisted in 2008, after it was relocated. It was relisted on the National Register of Historic Places in 2014 at its new location.

References

External links

Houses on the National Register of Historic Places in North Carolina
Italianate architecture in North Carolina
Houses completed in 1875
Houses in Raleigh, North Carolina
National Register of Historic Places in Raleigh, North Carolina